Robert Conley (born April 30, 1977) is an American former professional basketball player.

Career
  BC Alita (1999–2000)
  Brest (2000–2001)
  Phantoms Braunschweig (2001)
  Basket Livorno (2001–2002)
  Greenville Groove (2002)
  Basket Livorno (2002–2003)
  Ionikos NF (2003–2004)
  Girona (2004)
  TauCeramica (2004–2005)
  Hemofarm (2005–2006)
  Aironi Novara (2006–2007)
  Atléticos de San Germán (2007)
  ASVEL Villeurbanne (2007–2008)
  Maccabi Rishon LeZion (2008–2009)
  Bilbao (2009–2010)
  Poitiers (2010)

External links
 Robert Conley at abaliga.com
 Robert Conley at euroleague.net
 Robert Conley at acb.com

1977 births
Living people
ABA League players
African-American basketball players
American expatriate basketball people in France
American expatriate basketball people in Germany
American expatriate basketball people in Israel
American expatriate basketball people in Italy
American expatriate basketball people in Serbia
American expatriate basketball people in Spain
ASVEL Basket players
Atléticos de San Germán players
Basketball Löwen Braunschweig players
Basketball players from Georgia (U.S. state)
Bilbao Basket players
CB Girona players
Clayton State Lakers men's basketball players
Greenville Groove players
Ionikos N.F. B.C. players
KK Hemofarm players
Liga ACB players
People from Decatur, Georgia
Saski Baskonia players
Sportspeople from DeKalb County, Georgia
American men's basketball players
Small forwards
Shooting guards
21st-century African-American sportspeople
20th-century African-American sportspeople